Deulgaon, commonly known as "Deulgaon Ghat" is a village located in Ashti taluka of Beed district, in state of Maharashtra.

Demographics
As per 2011 census
Deulgaon Ghat has 407 families residing. The village has population of 1843.
Out of the population of 1843, 977 are males while 866 are females. 
Literacy rate of the village is 75.00%.
Average sex ratio of the village is 886 females to 1000 males. Average sex ratio of Maharashtra state is 929.

Geography, and transport

References

Villages in Beed district